The 1834 United States Senate special election in Pennsylvania was held on December 6, 1834. Future President of the United States James Buchanan was elected by the Pennsylvania General Assembly to the United States Senate.

Background
Democrat William Wilkins was elected to the United States Senate by the Pennsylvania General Assembly, consisting of the House of Representatives and the Senate, in 1830. Sen. Wilkins resigned on June 30, 1834, after being appointed U.S. Minister to Russia by President Andrew Jackson.

Results
Following the resignation of Sen. William Wilkins, the Pennsylvania General Assembly convened on December 6, 1834, to elect a new Senator to fill the vacancy. Four ballots were recorded. The results of the fourth and final ballot of both houses combined are as follows:

|-
|-bgcolor="#EEEEEE"
| colspan="3" align="right" | Totals
| align="right" | 133
| align="right" | 100.00%
|}

See also 
 United States Senate elections, 1834 and 1835

References

External links
Pennsylvania Election Statistics: 1682-2006 from the Wilkes University Election Statistics Project

1834 special
Pennsylvania 1834
Pennsylvania special
United States Senate special
United States Senate 1834 special
December 1834 events
James Buchanan